Straidarran is a small village between Feeny and Claudy in County Londonderry, Northern Ireland. In the 2001 Census it had a population of 177. It is within the townlands of Clagan and Killycor, and is situated within Causeway Coast and Glens district.

References 

Villages in County Londonderry
Causeway Coast and Glens district